The 2017 ICC Americas Under-19 Championship was an international cricket tournament held in Canada, from 17 to 23 July 2017. It was the ninth edition of the ICC Americas Under-19 Championship, and the first held in Canada since 2013.  Canada U19 won the tournament on net run rate (NRR) and advanced to the 2018 Under-19 World Cup.

Teams 
The 2017 version of the tournament featured three teams. The winner qualified for the 2018 Under-19 Cricket World Cup.

Venues
The following venues were used for the tournament:
 Maple Leaf Cricket Club, King City, Ontario, Canada
 Toronto Cricket, Skating and Curling Club, Toronto, Ontario, Canada

Squads
The following players were selected for the tournament:

Alexander Shoff and Abhishek Kattuparambil were originally named to the USA squad, but were unable to participate due to injury. Aravind Patnam and Harish Easwaraiah were named to the squad as replacements.

Round-robin

Final standings

References

External links
 Series home at ESPN Cricinfo

2017 in cricket
 
Under-19 regional cricket tournaments
International cricket competitions in Canada
2017 in Canadian cricket